Durand "Rudy" Macklin (born February 19, 1958) is an American former professional basketball player.

A 6'7" forward from Louisville, Kentucky, Macklin played at Louisiana State University from 1976 to 1981. In his very first game for LSU, he grabbed 32 rebounds against Tulane University. He missed most of the 1978-79 season because of an ankle injury, but recovered, and was named an NCAA First Team All-American in 1980 and 1981. As a senior, he was named the Southeastern Conference Player of the Year and led LSU to the NCAA Final Four. He graduated as LSU's all-time leading rebounder (1,276) and second-all-time leading scorer (2,080).

In 1981, Macklin was selected by the Atlanta Hawks with the 52nd overall pick of the NBA Draft. He played two seasons with the Hawks, averaging 6.5 points per game and 3.0 rebounds per game. He was then traded to the New York Knicks for Sly Williams, but was cut by the Knicks after just eight games because chronic muscle cramping was hindering his play. Macklin tried to revive his basketball career with stints in the Continental Basketball Association and in the Philippines, but continued to be dogged by muscle cramping, and decided to retire from the sport to become a banker in Baton Rouge, Louisiana.

Macklin is currently the executive director of the Louisiana Bureau of Minority Health Access and Promotions and the Governor's Council on Physical Fitness and Sports.

On February 6, 2010, at halftime of the LSU vs. Kentucky basketball game, Macklin became the fourth LSU men's basketball player to have his jersey retired by the school. His number 40 jersey now hangs in the rafters of the Pete Maravich Assembly Center along with Pete Maravich's number 23, Shaquille O'Neal's number 33, and Bob Pettit's number 50.

References

1958 births
Living people
All-American college men's basketball players
American men's basketball players
Atlanta Hawks draft picks
Atlanta Hawks players
Basketball players from Louisville, Kentucky
LSU Tigers basketball players
New York Knicks players
Shooting guards
Small forwards
American expatriate basketball people in the Philippines
Philippine Basketball Association imports
Shell Turbo Chargers players